Sanford is a surname. Notable people with the surname include:

 Adam Sanford, Dominican cricketer
 Agnes Sanford, American Christian writer
 Arlene Sanford, American film and television director
 Chance Sanford, American baseball player
 Charles S. Sanford Jr., American businessman
 Chris Sanford (born 1968), American retired mixed martial artist
 Claudius Sanford, Dominican politician in the House of Assembly of Dominica
 Curtis Sanford, Canadian ice hockey goaltender
Donald Sanford, American-Israeli Olympic sprinter
 Edmund Sanford, American psychologist
 Edward Sanford (disambiguation), multiple people
 Elias B. Sanford (1843–1932), American clergyman
 Eva Matthews Sanford (1894–1954), American Medieval and Classical Scholar
 Fred Sanford, American baseball player
 Fred Sanford, American musician
 Garwin Sanford, Canadian actor
 Henry Shelton Sanford, American diplomat and businessman, founder of the city of Sanford, Florida.
 Isabel Sanford, American actress and comedian
 Jack Sanford (1917–2005), American baseball player (first baseman)
 Jack Sanford (1929–2000), American baseball player (pitcher)
 James Sanford (disambiguation), multiple people
 John A. Sanford (1929–2005), also known as Jack, American Jungian psychoanalyst and Episcopal priest
 John C. Sanford (born 1950), American plant geneticist and advocate of intelligent design and young earth creationism
 John E. Sanford (died 1907), U.S. politician in Massachusetts
 John Elroy Sanford, birth name of American comedian Redd Foxx 
 John F. A. Sanford, one party to the U.S. Supreme Court case of Dred Scott v. Sandford [sic]
 John Langton Sanford (1824–1877), English historical writer
 John Sanford (author) (1904–2003), American author and screenwriter, born Julian Lawrence Shapiro
 John Sanford (governor) (1605–1653), founder of Portsmouth, Rhode Island, USA
 John Sanford (1803) (1803–1857), U.S. Representative from New York
 John Sanford (1851) (1851–1939), U.S. Representative from New York
 John W. A. Sanford (1798–1870), U.S. Representative from Georgia
 Katherine Sanford (1915–2005), American cancer biologist
 Kiki Sanford, American neurophysiologist and science communicator
 Leonard Cutler Sanford (1868–1950), American surgeon and ornithologist
 Lillias Rumsey Sanford, American school founder
 Linda Sanford (born 1953), American technology executive
 Louis Childs Sanford, American Episcopal bishop
 Lucius Sanford, American American football player
 Maria L. Sanford, American educator
 Margaret Rose Sanford (1918–2006), First Lady of North Carolina
 Mark Sanford (born 1960), American South Carolina politician
 Mike Sanford, American college football coach
 Mike Sanford Jr., American football coach
 Mitchell Sanford (1799–1861), New York politician
 Nathan Sanford (1777–1838), New York politician, US Senator
 Nehemiah Curtis Sanford, American industrialist and politician
 Reuben Sanford (1780–1855), New York politician
 Richard K. Sanford (1822–1895), New York politician
 Roscoe Frank Sanford, American astronomer
 Scott Sanford (born 1963), American politician, accountant, and Baptist clergyman
 T. Denny Sanford, American businessman and philanthropist
 Taylor Sanford, American baseball player, coach, and college athletics administrator
 Terry Sanford (1917–1998), American governor and senator from North Carolina
 Vincent Sanford (born 1990), American basketball player
 William Ayshford Sanford (1818–1902), naturalist and Colonial Secretary of Western Australia
 William Eli Sanford, Canadian businessman, philanthropist, and politician
 Winifred Sanford (1890–1983), American writer
 Zach Sanford (born 1994), American ice hockey player

Fictional characters 
 Fred G. Sanford, of the TV series Sanford and Son
 Lamont Sanford, of the TV series Sanford and Son, portrayed by Demond Wilson

See also
 Sandford (surname)

English toponymic surnames